Wolfgang Aly (12 August 1881 in Magdeburg – 3 September 1962 in Phaistos, Crete) was a German classical philologist. He was a member of the NSDAP (Nazi Party). On 1 December 1931, he joined and was the first member of the NSDAP (Nazi Party) of Freiburg University.

Works (selected) 
See also External links section below. 

Index verborum Strabonianus, Bonn, Habelt, 1983

References

External links
 

German classical philologists
1881 births
1962 deaths
Nazi Party members
Academic staff of the University of Freiburg
Writers from Magdeburg